Buckner Stith Morris (August 19, 1800 – December 16, 1879) served as mayor of Chicago, Illinois (1838–1839) for the Whig Party.

Morris married Evelina Barker in Kentucky in 1832 and the couple moved to Chicago in 1834 where Morris established a law practice with J. Young Scammon. He helped to create the Chicago Lyceum, the city's first literary society. By 1835, however, Morris had left his partnership with Scammon, and was practicing law with Edward Casey. He was elected mayor of Chicago in 1838 and went would subsequently serve as Alderman from the 6th Ward from 1839-1840 and again in 1844, resigning during his second tenure as alderman. He unsuccessfully ran for the office of Illinois Secretary of State in 1852 under the Whig ticket and served as a Lake County Circuit Court Judge from 1853 to 1855.

Following Evelina's death in 1847, he married Eliza Stephenson in 1850.  Eliza died in 1855. Morris died in Chicago in 1879.

Morris was outspoken in his opposition to the American Civil War, and appeared to sympathize with the "Copperheads." In 1864, he was arrested for aiding in a Confederate attempt to free prisoners of war from Camp Douglas in Chicago. He was held for 9 months, but was then exonerated by a military court. Being unable, while so detained, to attend to his business affairs, he lost most of his assets through foreclosures. Incensed over the treatment of their ancestor, his heirs refused to donate his papers to the Chicago Historical Society when they were requested.

The first use recorded in the Oxford English Dictionary of the phrase to hell in a hand basket, is in The Great North-Western Conspiracy in All Its Startling Details, by I. Windslow Ayer, in alleging that, at a meeting of the Order of the Sons of Liberty, Judge Morris of the Circuit Court of Illinois said: "Thousands of our best men were prisoners in Camp Douglas, and if once at liberty would 'send abolitionists to hell in a hand basket.'" Note that he was portrayed as Judge Morris in that anecdote dated 1865, although his time on the bench was of the previous decade.
Morris was a member of Chicago's oldest meeting Freemason Lodge, Oriental Lodge # 33.

See also
 Camp Douglas Conspiracy
 Oriental Lodge # 33

References

External links
 

1800 births
1879 deaths
Burials at Rosehill Cemetery
Illinois state court judges
Chicago City Council members
Mayors of Chicago
Illinois Whigs
19th-century American politicians
Illinois Know Nothings
People from Augusta, Kentucky
American anti-war activists
19th-century American judges
Copperheads (politics)